Manju Warrier is an Indian actress and dancer who primarily appears in Malayalam films. She is one of the most successful leading actresses in Malayalam cinema, and has been referred to as the lady superstar of Malayalam cinema.

Warrier won the National Film Award – Special Mention for her performance as Bhadra in Kannezhuthi Pottum Thottu. She also won the Kerala State Film Award for Best Actress for her performance as Anjali in Ee Puzhayum Kadannu, along with six Filmfare Awards for Best Actress, a record in that category.

National Film Awards

Kerala State Film Awards

Filmfare Awards South

Kerala Film Critics Association Awards

Screen Videocon Awards

South Indian International Movie Awards

Asianet Film Awards

Vanitha Film Awards

Asiavision Awards

IIFA Utsavam

North American Film Awards

Other Awards

References 

Warrier, Manju